Tim Davies (born 18 October 1983) is an Australian journalist and television presenter. Since 2020, he has been the weather presenter on the Nine Network's Today program.

Career
After studying journalism at Macleay College in Sydney, he joined radio station Nova 96.9 as a traffic reporter in 2003 before moving on to cover general news and report on major events for the DMG Radio Australia network.

In 2009, Davies joined the Seven Network as a producer, working on such programs as Sunrise, Weekend Sunrise and The Morning Show.

Davies joined Austereo Radio Network as a news presenter in 2013, where he read the news on The Kyle and Jackie O Show on 2Day FM. Davies continued the role at 2Day FM in 2014 after The Kyle and Jackie O Show defected to rival station KIIS 106.5.

In 2014, Davies left Austereo to join the Nine Network, initially as a producer and reporter for Nine News before becoming a presenter of Nine News: Early Edition and a fill-in host on Today Extra and Weekend Today.

In late 2019, it was announced that Davies would be replacing Steve Jacobs as the weather presenter on the network's breakfast program Today, commencing in 2020 as part of a widely-publicised overhaul.

In October 2022, Davies reported seeing masked men who he believed were looting houses as he and a Today crew arrived to set up a live cross in a flood affected area of Maribyrnong, prompting him to contact police. Victoria Police later confirmed they were investigating a man who allegedly stole several personal items from an unoccupied home while two accomplices waited in a blue Ford Territory.

Personal life
Davies is Christian. As a child, Davies attended St Frances de Sales, a Catholic primary school in Woolooware.

Davies is openly gay. 

After a holiday in Austria in March 2020, Davies was on one of the first international flights to land in Australia after the federal government ordered all passengers arriving in Australia to self-isolate for 14 days at the onset of the COVID-19 pandemic.

References

Weather presenters
Australian television presenters
Nine News presenters
Australian LGBT journalists
1983 births
Living people